The WCT Invitational was a professional men's tennis tournament held from 1978 through 1981 in the United States.  The tournament was held in Forest Hills, New York on clay courts from 1978–79 and in Salisbury, Maryland on indoor carpet courts from 1980–81.  The singles event was played as a round-robin format and a doubles event was played when the tournament was held in Forest Hills, also in a round-robin format.

Finals

Singles

Doubles

External links
 ATP Tour archive
 ITF search

Defunct tennis tournaments in the United States
Carpet court tennis tournaments
Clay court tennis tournaments